Burson may refer to:
Burson, California
Charles Burson, Chief of Staff to the Vice President Al Gore
Clare Burson, American singer-songwriter
Colette Burson, American screenwriter
Greg Burson, (1949-2008), American voice actor
Harold Burson, co-founder of  public relations and communications firm Burson-Marsteller
Jay Burson, American basketball player
Jimmy Burson (1940- ), American football player
Nancy Burson (1948- ), American artist